Prairie Spirit School Division No. 206 has 47 schools located in 28 communities surrounding the city of Saskatoon, Saskatchewan which includes 3 First Nations and 9 Hutterite communities.  The student population of approximately 12,000 surrounds the city of Saskatoon, Saskatchewan as a ring of rural communities around the urban centre.

Prairie Spirit School Division is under the jurisdiction of the Saskatchewan Ministry of Education.

See also
List of school districts in Saskatchewan

References

External links
Prairie Spirit School Division No. 206
Prairie Spirit School Division No. 206 map

School divisions in Saskatchewan
Saskatchewan